Mombasa is a city on the coast of Kenya.

Mombasa may also refer to:

 Mombasa County, one of the 47 counties of Kenya
 Mombasa Island, a coral outcrop located on Kenya's coast
 Mombasa (board game), a 2015 Euro-style game by Alexander Pfister
 "Mombasa" (song), a song by the Finnish singer Taiska
 1428 Mombasa, an asteroid
 Mombasa, a fictional character in the sci-fi action film Predators